Svetlana Lukasheva (born 2 May 1977) is a Kazakhstani middle distance runner who specialized in the 1500 metres.

Competition record

Personal bests
800 metres - 2:03.77 min (2003)
1500 metres - 4:13.83 min (2005)

References

1977 births
Living people
Kazakhstani female middle-distance runners
Athletes (track and field) at the 2002 Asian Games
Athletes (track and field) at the 2006 Asian Games
Asian Games competitors for Kazakhstan
21st-century Kazakhstani women